Lucille Roberts (December 7, 1943 – July 17, 2003) was an American businesswoman and entrepreneur who founded the Lucille Roberts chain of health clubs. A self-proclaimed "exercise nut," she turned her passion for working out into a health club empire worth $30 million at the time of her death.

Early years
Born into a Jewish family in Tajikistan, she and her family emigrated to the United States and settled in Brooklyn, New York in the early 1950s.  An immigration intake official, as was often done at the time, altered the hard-to-pronounce names of the family.  Since the young girl reminded her of the I Love Lucy television program, Laja's name was changed to Lucille. Roberts graduated from University of Pennsylvania (College for Women Class of 1964) and was one of the first women to earn a degree from Harvard Business School's Owner/President Management program.

Career
In 1969, Roberts and her husband opened a spa in midtown Manhattan next to Macy's. Roberts' goal was to offer affordable exercise facilities geared towards women. In response to the public's confusion that it was an auto repair business (the original name of the gym was The Body Shop), she renamed it Lucille Roberts, and eventually opened gyms in 50 other locations in the northeastern United States.

Roberts also wrote and published the books, Computercise and The Lucille Roberts 14 Day Makeover.

Death
Roberts died from lung cancer on July 17, 2003, aged 59, at a Manhattan hospital. She was survived by her husband, Bob Roberts, and their two children, Kevin & Kirk Roberts.

References

External links
Lucille Roberts (company) official website
Lucille Roberts Blog
Lucille Roberts Obituary

1943 births
2003 deaths
20th-century American businesspeople
20th-century American women writers
Pennsylvania State University alumni
Harvard Business School alumni
American people of Russian-Jewish descent
Deaths from lung cancer in New York (state)
Soviet emigrants to the United States
People from Brooklyn
21st-century American women